Cedar Grove High School (CGHS) is located at 2360 River Road, Ellenwood, Georgia, United States in suburban south DeKalb County. It opened in the fall of 1972 with an enrollment of 512 students.

Enrollment has fluctuated over the years with the development of the surrounding area. In 1993, with the resurgence of housing developments in the area, enrollment began to increase.

Cedar Grove High has six computer labs - one writing composition lab, one math/science lab, three business labs, and a NAF AOIT Academy lab. A teacher computer in each classroom is networked with internet access.

Since the inception of the Bill Gates Millennium Scholars Program, Cedar Grove High has had winners: two in the first year, two in the second year, and one in the third.

Notable alumni 
 Xavier Avery, professional baseball player
 B. J. Cohen, former arena football player
 Dion Glover, professional basketball player
 Reggie Johnson, basketball player
 DeAngelo Malone, NFL football player
 Marcus McNeill, NFL football player
 Natina Reed, rapper and member of Blaque
 Justin Shaffer, NFL football player
 Alfonso Smith, Jr., former professional soccer player

References

DeKalb County School District high schools
Educational institutions established in 1996
1996 establishments in Georgia (U.S. state)